Angelina Anne Genford (born 30 October 2002) is an Australian cricketer who plays as a right-arm fast-medium bowler and right-handed batter for Sydney Sixers in the Women's Big Bash League (WBBL) and Australian Capital Territory in the Women's National Cricket League (WNCL). She made her professional debut during the 2021–22 WBBL for the Hurricanes against Adelaide Strikers, scoring eight runs off 12 balls in a 48-run loss.

References

External links

Angelina Genford at Cricket Australia

2002 births
Living people
Cricketers from Sydney
Australian women cricketers
Hobart Hurricanes (WBBL) cricketers
Sydney Sixers (WBBL) cricketers
New South Wales Breakers cricketers
ACT Meteors cricketers